Timo Hagman (born 16 November 1955) is a Finnish sports shooter. He competed in two events at the 1980 Summer Olympics.

References

External links
 

1955 births
Living people
Finnish male sport shooters
Olympic shooters of Finland
Shooters at the 1980 Summer Olympics
People from Kannus
Sportspeople from Central Ostrobothnia